The 2016 Utah gubernatorial election was held on November 8, 2016, to elect the Governor and Lieutenant Governor of Utah, concurrently with the 2016 U.S. presidential election, as well as elections to the United States Senate and elections to the United States House of Representatives and various state and local elections.

Incumbent Republican Governor Gary Herbert ran for re-election to a second full term in office. Republican challenger Jonathan E. Johnson defeated Herbert in the state convention to secure a spot on the primary ballot, but Herbert won the June 28, 2016 primary and secured the nomination. The Democratic party nominated former CHG Healthcare Services CEO Mike Weinholtz at the Utah Democratic convention in April.

Herbert won the general election, defeating Weinholtz by a large margin.

Background
Republican Governor Jon Huntsman, Jr. resigned in August 2009 to become United States Ambassador to China and Lieutenant Governor Herbert succeeded him. He was elected to serve out the remainder of Huntsman's term in a 2010 special election and was re-elected to a full four-year term in 2012.

Republican nomination
Former Speaker of the Utah House of Representatives Rebecca D. Lockhart was widely believed to be a potential Republican candidate, but she died of a rare neurodegenerative brain disease in January 2015.

Incumbent governor Gary Herbert won the June 28, 2016 primary, defeating Overstock.com Chairman Jonathan Johnson.

Candidates

Declared
 Gary Herbert, incumbent Governor
 Jonathan "JJ" Johnson, businessman and chairman of the board of Overstock.com

Polling

{| class="wikitable"
|- valign= bottom
! style="width:160px;"| Poll source
! style="width:160px;"| Date(s)administered
! class=small | Samplesize
! Margin oferror
! style="width:100px;"| GaryHerbert
! style="width:100px;"| JonathanJohnson
! Undecided
|-
| SurveyUSA
| align=center| June 6–8, 2016
| align=center| 517
| align=center| ± 4.1%
|  align=center| 69%
| align=center| 24%
| align=center| 6%

Results

Democratic nomination
Weinholtz defeated Cook at the Democratic convention to become the nominee.

Candidates

Declared
 Mike Weinholtz, former Chairman and CEO of CHG Healthcare Services

Withdrew
 Vaughn R Cook, founder and CEO of ZYTO Technologies

Declined
 Ed Allen, former State Senator
 Jim Dabakis, State Senator and former Chairman of the Utah Democratic Party
 Jim Matheson, former U.S. Representative
 Ben McAdams, Mayor of Salt Lake County and former State Senator

General election

Debates
Complete video of debate, September 26, 2016 - C-SPAN

Predictions

Polling

 → Internal poll conducted on behalf of the Utah Republican Party.

with Jonathan Johnson

with Jim Matheson

Results

References

External links
Official campaign websites
Gary Herbert (R) for Governor
Mike Weinholtz (D) for Governor

2016
Utah
2016 Utah elections